Mi rival is a Mexican telenovela produced by Valentín Pimstein for Televisa in 1973. Based on the soap opera of Ines Rodena, Cuando la rival es una hija.

Cast 
Saby Kamalich as María Elena
Enrique Álvarez Félix as Jorge
Carlos Bracho as Gonzalo
Lupe Lara as Elenita
Sara García as Chayo
Cuco Sánchez as Cuco
Aarón Hernán as Anselmo
Olga Breeskin as Olga
Lola Beltran as Lola
Ana Lilia Tovar as Diana
Eric del Castillo
Silvia Pasquel as Maritza
Karina Duprez 
Juan Diego Viña 
Alejandro Ciangherotti 
María Rivas 
Margarita Cortés 
Pedro Damián  as Daniel
Leticia Perdigón 
Arturo Benavides as Genaro
María Rojo as Rosenda

References

External links 

Mexican telenovelas
1973 telenovelas
Televisa telenovelas
Spanish-language telenovelas
1973 Mexican television series debuts
1973 Mexican television series endings